Spodiopsar is a genus of Asian birds in the family Sturnidae.

Species
The genus contains two species.

References

 
Bird genera